Jonathan Hill Jacocks House is a historic plantation house located in New Hope Township, Perquimans County, North Carolina.   It is a large, two-story, frame dwelling consisting of two houses joined in an L-plan configuration.  The older section is a two-story, three bay, single pile Federal style frame structure.  About 1838, it was enlarged to a central hall plan with six bays, and with a two-story rear ell.  It was also renovated in the Greek Revival style.  A full width portico with Doric order columns was added about 1847–1848.

The house was added to the National Register of Historic Places in 1998.

References

Plantation houses in North Carolina
Houses on the National Register of Historic Places in North Carolina
Federal architecture in North Carolina
Greek Revival houses in North Carolina
Houses completed in 1815
Houses in Perquimans County, North Carolina
National Register of Historic Places in Perquimans County, North Carolina